Crane Plumbing Corporation was a Canadian manufacturer of plumbing fixtures, established in Winnipeg, Manitoba, in 1906, as a subsidiary of the U.S. firm Crane Company (founded 1855 in Chicago by Richard T. Crane).  Crane Company merged in February 2008 with American Standard Americas and Eljer to create American Standard Brands.  Over the course of its history, Crane Plumbing Corporation had moved to Montreal, Quebec and as of 2012, it was based in Stratford, Ontario, largely in a customer support role. Currently, American Standard Canada operates out of Mississauga, Ontario. Crane Plumbing also in the 1980's acquired Universal Rundle.

Crane products include:

 bathtubs
 showers
 sinks
 toilets
 washstands
 bidets

References

 About Crane
 

Defunct companies based in Winnipeg
Manufacturing companies established in 1906
Manufacturing companies of Canada
Stratford, Ontario
Building materials companies of the United States
Bathroom fixture companies
Canadian subsidiaries of foreign companies
Canadian brands
1906 establishments in Manitoba